YESCO is a privately owned manufacturer of electric signs based in Salt Lake City, founded by Thomas Young in 1920. The company provides design, fabrication, installation and maintenance of signs.

Many notable sign projects have been produced by YESCO, including the NBC Experience globe in New York City, the historic El Capitan Theatre and Wax Museum marquees in Hollywood, the Reno Arch, and in Las Vegas, Vegas Vic, the Fremont Street Experience, the Astrolabe in The Venetian, the Wynn Las Vegas resort sign, and the Aria Resort & Casino.

History 
The company was created by Thomas Young on March 20, 1920. The young sign painter had left the United Kingdom just a decade earlier to immigrate with his family to Ogden, Utah. In the beginning, his shop specialized in coffin plates, gold leaf window lettering, lighted signs and painted advertisements. Tom Young's signs improved as the science of sign-making advanced.

In 1933, YESCO opened a branch office in the Apache Hotel in Las Vegas. The company erected their first neon sign in Las Vegas for the Boulder Club.

YESCO – soon became recognized as a leader in the sign industry, tackling large and complex sign projects. For example, it erected the first neon spectacular sign in Las Vegas for the Boulder Club in the late 1930s, and in 1995 it completed the four-block-long Fremont Street Experience canopy in Las Vegas.

YESCO continues to design, build, install and maintain signs and interior displays in areas. In recent years, YESCO has built a substantial outdoor digital media (billboard) division of its business.

YESCO has approximately 1,000 employees, more than 40 offices, and operates three manufacturing plants featuring automated and custom equipment. Additional smaller manufacturing and service facilities are located through the United States and Canada.

YESCO offers sign and lighting service franchises in states east of Colorado and throughout Canada.

In 2015 Young Electric Sign Company sold YESCO Electronics, a subsidiary company, to Samsung Electronics of America, Inc.. Samsung rebranded the division as Prismview.

Landmark Signs

The NBC Experience Store Globe
NBC ushered in the millennium with a new YESCO “message globe” in its NBC Experience store, located at Rockefeller Center in New York City. The electronic sign quickly became recognized as one of the most distinctive electronic displays in the world.

From the outside of the building, it looks like a brilliant illuminated globe. The 35’-diameter hemisphere is covered with thousands of full-color LEDs. Colorful video and special effects, along with animations provided by YESCO's media services group, are displayed on the globe's surface, telling the NBC story. When it was first turned on, it literally stopped traffic on West 49th Street.

Vegas Vic

Perhaps the world's most recognized electronic sign, Vegas Vic was designed by and built by YESCO. Upon its installation in 1951 over the Pioneer Club on historical Fremont Street, the 40'-tall electronic cowboy immediately became Las Vegas's unofficial greeter.

Wynn Las Vegas
The eraser weighs 62,000 pounds, and is counterbalanced by a 62,000-pound weight inside the sign.

The sign uses 4,377,600 LEDs and the eraser is powered by a  motor at its base that runs a gear and cable system.

The Fremont Street Experience

Welcome to Fabulous Las Vegas

YESCO owns the Welcome to Fabulous Las Vegas sign.

Other projects
YESCO designed and installed the signs and light-up strips at Allegiant Stadium, the home of the Las Vegas Raiders and UNLV Rebels Football. The company also designed and installed the signage at the Raiders' headquarters and practice facility in Henderson, Nevada.

The company has provided support to the Neon Museum, which is dedicated to preserving the neon signs and associated artifacts of Las Vegas. Some of the retired signs include the sign for the Silver Slipper casino and Aladdin's lamp from the first version of the Aladdin Casino.

Key individuals

Founder 
Born in Sunderland, United Kingdom in 1895, Thomas Young was 15 years old when his family emigrated to Ogden, Utah. Hard-working and talented, the boy applied his passion to making signs, becoming a Master Sign Writer. He began by creating wall-lettering and gold-leaf window signs, working for the Electric Service Company and the Redfield-King Sign Company in Ogden.

Young married Elmina Carlisle in 1916. Four years later, in 1920, he founded his own sign company: Thomas Young Sign Company, which specialized in coffin plates, gold window lettering, lighted signs and painted advertisements.

In 1932 Young expanded his business to Las Vegas, and within two years purchased the Ogden Armory for $12,000 to expand production capacity. He also started a branch in Salt Lake City in that year.

Young was elected president of the National Sign Association in 1936, serving for two terms. A year later, in 1937, he moved his family and YESCO headquarters to Salt Lake City, Utah, and continued expanding the business.

In 1969 Young turned over the reins of company leadership to his son who currently serves as the chairman of the board. The company is now managed by third and fourth generations of the Young family.

Designers 
Some of YESCO's most prominent signage designers have included:
 Charles Barnard - designer of Vegas Vickie
 Rudy Crisostomo - designer of the Rio's column
 Dan Edwards - designer of Lucky the Clown of Circus Circus
 Jack Larsen Sr - designer of the Silver Slipper
 Kermit Wayne - designer of the Stardust
 Pat Denner - designer of the Vegas Vic and Wendover Will
 Jim Geitzen - designer of the Aria Resort and Casino and The Linq

References

External links 
 The Neon Museum website

Signage companies
Neon lighting
History of Las Vegas
Manufacturing companies based in Salt Lake City
American companies established in 1920
Design companies established in 1920
Manufacturing companies established in 1920
1920 establishments in Utah